Patricia Chagnon (born 20 November 1963) is a French member of the European parliament since July 2022.

Of Dutch origin, she has lived in France since the 90s and speaks English and Dutch. During the period when the channel is authorized, she regularly speaks on RT France.

President of the Abbeville Tourist Office, she was sentenced in 2018 to a fine of 10,000 euros, including 8,000 suspended, as well as two years of ineligibility, for moral harassment of her director. She appealed and in 2021 the conviction was upheld but the ineligibility was canceled.

She has been an opposition municipal councilor for Abbeville and a community councilor for the Communauté d'agglomération de la Baie de Somme since 2014.

She was regional councillor for the Hauts-de-France region from 2015 to 2021.

She is in 26th position in 2019 on the European list of the National Rally led by Jordan Bardella, which obtains 23 elected.

She became a member of the European Parliament to replace her colleagues from the RN, elected members of parliament in the legislative elections of 2022.

References 

Living people
1963 births
MEPs for France 2019–2024